The 1979–80 Montenegrin Republic League was 35th season of Montenegrin Republic League. Season started in August 1979 and finished in May 1980.

Season 

In Montenegrin Republic League 1979-80 participated 14 teams. Among the clubs which didn't play on previous season were Jedinstvo (relegated from Yugoslav Second League) and three best teams from lower tier - Metalac, Ibar and Mornar. The title won Lovćen, with seven points more than Tekstilac

Table

Higher leagues 
On season 1979–80, three Montenegrin teams played in higher leagues of SFR Yugoslavia. Budućnost participated in 1979–80 Yugoslav First League, while two other teams (Sutjeska and OFK Titograd) played in 1979–80 Yugoslav Second League.

See also 
 Montenegrin Republic League
Montenegrin Republic Cup (1947–2006)
Montenegrin clubs in Yugoslav football competitions (1946–2006)
Montenegrin Football Championship (1922–1940)

References

Montenegrin Republic League
1979–80 in Yugoslav football
1979–80 in European third tier association football leagues